National Kaohsiung University of Applied Sciences (KUAS) was a university located in Yanchao District, Kaohsiung, Taiwan.

History

In 1963, Taiwan Provincial Government assigned funds to establish the Provincial Kaohsiung Institute of Technology at its present location.
In the fall of 1963, the Institute opened its gates to admit junior high graduates to Chemical Engineering and Civil Engineering Departments for five-year programs.
Since 1965, studies have begun successively in Mechanical Engineering, Electrical Engineering, Electronic Engineering, and Mold & Die Engineering Departments.
In 1965, the two-year night-school program was set up to offer training in the field of Chemical Engineering, Civil Engineering, Mechanical Engineering, Electrical Engineering, Electronic Engineering, and Mold & Die Engineering, as well as Industrial Engineering & Management.
In 1972, the Institute initiated a two-year daytime program for senior high school (vocational) graduates. It was offered in Chemical, Civil, Electrical, Electronic, Mechanical, Mold & Die Engineering as well as Industrial Engineering & Management Departments.
In October 1979, the Supplementary School affiliated with the Institute was founded. It offered two-year programs for young professionals. The course took three years to complete and was held on Saturday nights and Sundays in the field of engineering.
In October 1991, Dr. Kuang-Chih Huang was appointed the Head of the Institute. He strengthened the faculty and enhanced the quality of teaching and of research.
In August 1992, the two-year programs were established in Accounting & Statistics, International Trade, Business Management, Banking & Insurance, Finance & Tax, and Tourism Departments.
In January 1993, the Kaohsiung County Government designated a large plot of land (106.3 hectares) at Shen-sui farm to be the second campus of the Institute. The construction of this campus is currently underway.
In 1997, NKIT was promoted to technical college status. A senior two-year undergraduate program was offered in Chemical, Civil, Electrical, Electronic, and Mold & Die Engineering Departments. The following year, the programs expanded to include Mechanical Engineering, Business Administration, and Accounting.
In the summer of 1998, night school under the Division of Continual and Extended Education started to offer the senior-two-year undergraduate program in Chemical and Civil Engineering. The Supplementary School was renamed to become the Institute of Continual Education, NKIT, and now offers a senior-two-year undergraduate program.
In August 1999, the four-year bachelor's degree program was established for the first time in Mold & Die, International Trade, Finance, and Tourism Management Departments.
In August 2000, the Institute was promoted and renamed the National Kaohsiung University of Applied Sciences.
In August 2001, Dr. Kuang-chih Huang retired and Dr. Ren-yih Lin took over as the acting president. Four departments—Applied Foreign Languages, Cultural Business, Human Resources and Information Management—were set up. The first three departments constituted the College of Humanities & Social Sciences. Later, Colleges of Engineering, of Commerce, and of Management were also established. Moreover, the university started to offer master's degree programs in Civil Engineering & Disaster Prevention Technology, in Electrical & Control Engineering, and in Electronic & Information Engineering.
In August 2002, five more master programs were initiated, in the fields of Chemical Engineering, Mold and Die-Making Engineering, Mechanical and Precision Engineering, Industrial Engineering & Management, and Commerce.
In October 2002, Dr. Ren-Yih Lin was elected the President of KUAS.
In August 2003, the College of Commerce merged with the College of Management. Department of Electrical Engineering started to offer the first doctorate program at the university. Two more graduate schools were set up in the business field—that of Finance & Information and of Tourism and Hospitality Management.

Academics

College of Engineering 
Department of Chemical and Materials Engineering
Department of Civil Engineering
Department of Mold and Die Engineering
Department of Industrial Engineering and Management
Department of Mechanical Engineering

College of Electrical Engineering and Computer Science 
Department of Electrical Engineering
Department of Electronic Engineering
Department of Computer Science and Information Engineering
Graduate Institute of Photonics and Communications

College of Management 
Graduate Institute of Commerce
Department of Accounting
Department of International Business
Department of Public Finance and Taxation
Department of Finance
Graduate Institute of Finance and Information
Department of Business Administration
Department of Tourism Management
Department of Information Management

College of Humanities and Social Sciences 
Department of Applied Foreign Languages
Department of Human Resource Development
Department of Culture and Creative Industries
Center of Teacher Education
Center of General Education

Sister Universities 
Japan-The International University of Kagoshima
United States- Tri-County Technical College

See also
 List of universities in Taiwan

References

External links 

1963 establishments in Taiwan
2018 disestablishments in Taiwan
Defunct universities and colleges in Taiwan
Educational institutions established in 1963
National Kaohsiung University of Science and Technology